Luscious may refer to:

 Luscious Jackson, a rock band formed in 1991
 Luscious Pink, a brand of perfume
 Luscious, alternate name used by Ali Forney

See also
 Lucious
 Lucius (disambiguation)